is a railway station on the Hisatsu Line in Kirishima, Kagoshima, Japan, operated by Kyushu Railway Company (JR Kyushu). The station opened in 1958.

Lines
Hinatayama Station is served by the Hisatsu Line.

Adjacent stations

Surrounding area

Hinatayama Post Office
Hinatayama Onsen
Yamanoyu Onsen

See also
 List of railway stations in Japan

External links

  

Railway stations in Japan opened in 1958
Railway stations in Kagoshima Prefecture